Les Portes-en-Ré is a commune of southwestern France, located on the Ré Island, in the French department of Charente-Maritime, historical region of Poitou-Charentes, administrative region of Nouvelle-Aquitaine.

Population

See also
 Île de Ré
Communes of the Charente-Maritime department

References

Communes of Charente-Maritime
Île de Ré
Charente-Maritime communes articles needing translation from French Wikipedia
Populated coastal places in France